"Homo Hill," also known as "The Hill" or "LGBTQ Street", is an informal name for an LGBTQ+ neighborhood in Itaewon, Seoul, South Korea. It is occupied by numerous LGBTQ+ establishments and is considered a safe space for LGBTQ+-identifying people. The creation of "Homo Hill" stems from the formation of the entertainment area for U.S. military soldiers during the time of the Korean War.

Itaewon is also home to a number of other minority groups.

History 
In the creation of modern Itaewon, many of the people who contributed had goals to make this space more liberal than other areas in South Korea that were made by older, more conservative generations.

With the introduction of the Korean War (1950s), U.S. military bases were created in South Korea, and more specifically, in close proximity to modern Itaewon. With the U.S. military base so close by, Itaewon became a recreational space of U.S. soldiers, which sparked an increase in new bars and clubs. In these spaces were also the presence of sex workers, along with a few gay establishments, which contributed to the perception of this area as a "sexually contaminated space."

The name "Homo Hill" is not an official name for the space. Some believe the term "Homo" is derogatory and so a majority of people in South Korea refer to the street as either "The Hill" or "LGBTQ Street". In addition, the terminology behind "Homo Hill" makes it seem to only encompass those who identify as homosexual, thereby excluding the rest of the LGBTQ+-identifying individuals.

Setting 
"Homo Hill" is one street, more specifically, a 360-foot long alleyway in the Itaewon district. This alleyway consists of approximately 10 to 15 LGBTQ+ bars, clubs, as well as other establishments. The street is known for its colorful graffitied walls and grounds, as well as its street art that signifies the acceptance of LGBTQ+ individuals.

Diversity 
The district of Itaewon is very diverse and is home to many minority groups in a set up similar to the ethnic enclaves found in other countries (i.e. Chinatown, Little Italy, etc.). These minorities include Muslims, LGBTQ+ individuals, and Nigerians. Along with “Homo Hill,” Itaewon contains “Islamic Street” which includes two mosques, as well as “African Street” in which many that belong to the Nigerian community live and socialize. Those in South Korea with more conservative values often stay away from Itaewon due to the rich diversity that exists there.

References 

Culture of Seoul
Geography of Seoul
LGBT culture in South Korea
Itaewon